Shipbuilding is a developed industry in Russia. The main short-term plan of the industry is the Complex Program to Advance Production of the Shipbuilding Industry on the Market between 2008 and 2015, which was approved by the Russian Government in October 2006. It envisages the establishment of a scientific center at the Krylov Institute, two engineering centers and three shipbuilding centers, the Western, Northern and Far Eastern Centers.

The main long-term plan is the "Strategy for developing the shipbuilding industry until 2020 and the future perspective".

Shipyards

Included United Shipbuilding Corporation (state corporation)

Western region (center in St. Petersburg)

Northern Region (center in Severodvinsk)

Far East Region (center in Vladivostok)

Central Region

Southern Region

Crimea

Design Bureau

Other

See also 
 List of shipyards of the Soviet Union
 List of Russian naval engineers
 Defense industry of Russia
 Russian Navy
 Future of the Russian Navy
 Russian floating nuclear power station

References 

Economy of Russia
Russia